Éder Moreno Fialho (born May 4, 1973 in Rio de Janeiro) is a long-distance runner from Brazil, who represented his native country in the men's marathon at the 2000 Summer Olympics in Sydney, Australia). He won the bronze medal in the same event, a year earlier at the 1999 Pan American Games. Fialho won the 1999 edition of the Beppu-Ōita Marathon in Japan.

Achievements

References

 
 Profile at Sports-Reference.com

1973 births
Living people
Brazilian male long-distance runners
Athletes (track and field) at the 2000 Summer Olympics
Olympic athletes of Brazil
Athletes (track and field) at the 1999 Pan American Games
Athletes from Rio de Janeiro (city)
Pan American Games medalists in athletics (track and field)
Pan American Games bronze medalists for Brazil
Medalists at the 1999 Pan American Games
20th-century Brazilian people
21st-century Brazilian people